Microsoft developed 11 versions of Internet Explorer for Windows from 1995 to 2013. Microsoft also developed Internet Explorer for Mac, Internet Explorer for UNIX, and Internet Explorer Mobile respectively for Apple Macintosh, Unix, and mobile devices; the first two are discontinued but the latter runs on Windows CE, Windows Mobile, and Windows Phone.

Beginnings and Spyglass Mosaic (1995–1997)
The first Internet Explorer was derived from Spyglass Mosaic. The original Mosaic came from NCSA, but since NCSA was a public entity it relied on Spyglass as its commercial licensing partner. Spyglass in turn delivered two versions of the Mosaic browser to Microsoft, one wholly based on the NCSA source code, and another engineered from scratch but conceptually modeled on the NCSA browser. Internet Explorer was initially built using the Spyglass, not the NCSA source code. The license to Microsoft provided Spyglass (and thus NCSA) with a quarterly fee plus a percentage of Microsoft's revenues for the software.

The browser was then modified and released as Internet Explorer. Microsoft originally released Internet Explorer 1.0 in August 1995 in two packages: at retail in Microsoft Plus! add-on for Windows 95 and via the simultaneous OEM release of Windows 95. Version 1.5 was released several months later for Windows NT, with support for basic table rendering, an important early web standard. Version 2.0 was released for both Windows 95 and Windows NT in November 1995, featuring support for SSL, cookies, VRML, and Internet newsgroups. Version 2.0 was also released for the Macintosh and Windows 3.1 in April 1996. Version 2 was also included in Microsoft's Internet Starter Kit for Windows 95 in early 1996, which retailed for US$19.99 and included a how-to book and 30 days of Internet access on MSN among other features.  Internet Explorer 3.0 was released free of charge in August 1996 by bundling it with Windows 95, another OEM release. Microsoft thus made no direct revenues on IE and was liable to pay Spyglass only the minimum quarterly fee. In 1997, Spyglass threatened Microsoft with a contractual audit, in response to which Microsoft settled for US$8 million. Version 3 included Internet Mail and News 1.0 and the Windows Address Book. It also brought the browser much closer to the bar that had been set by Netscape, including the support of Netscape's plugins technology (NPAPI), ActiveX, frames, and a reverse-engineered version of JavaScript named JScript. Later, Microsoft NetMeeting and Windows Media Player were integrated into the product and thus helper applications became not as necessary as they once were. Cascading Style Sheets (CSS) were also introduced with version 3 of Internet Explorer.

The Browser wars (1997–2001)

Version 4 released in September 1997, was shipped with Windows 95 OSR (OEM Service Release) 2.5, and the latest beta version of Windows 98 and was modified to integrate more closely with Microsoft Windows. It included an option to enable "Active Desktop" which displayed World Wide Web content on the desktop itself and was updated automatically as the content changed. The user could select other pages for use as Active Desktops as well. "Active Channel" technology was also introduced to automatically obtain information updates from websites. The technology was based on an XML standard known as Channel Definition Format (CDF), which predated the currently used web syndication formats like RSS. This version was designed to work on Windows 95, Windows 98, and Windows NT, and could be downloaded from the Internet, free of charge. It supported Dynamic HTML (DHTML). Outlook Express 4.0 also came integrated into the browser and replaced the aging Microsoft Internet Mail & News product that was released with previous versions. Version 5 came out in March 1999, following Microsoft's release of Internet Explorer 5.0 Beta versions in late 1998 . Bi-directional text, ruby text and direct XML/XSLT support were included in this release, along with enhanced support for CSS Level 1 and 2. The actual release of Internet Explorer 5 happened in three stages. Firstly, a Developer Preview was released in June 1998 (5.0B1), and then a Public Preview was released in November 1998 (5.0B2). Then in March 1999 the final release was released (5.0). In September it was released with Windows 98. Version 5.0 was the last one to be released for Windows 3.1x or Windows NT 3.x. Internet Explorer 5.5 was later released for Windows Me in July 2000, and included many bug fixes and security patches. Version 5.5 was the last to have Compatibility Mode, which allowed Internet Explorer 4 to be run side by side with the 5.x. With IE6, there was a quirks mode that could be triggered to make it behave like IE5.5 Version 6 was released with Windows XP on August 27, 2001. It mainly focused on privacy and security features, as they had become customer priorities. Microsoft implemented tools that support P3P, a technology under development by the W3C.

United States v. Microsoft

In a legal case brought by the US Department of Justice and twenty U.S. states, Microsoft was accused of breaking an earlier consent decree, by bundling Internet Explorer with its operating system software. The department took issue with Microsoft's contract with OEM computer manufacturers that bound the manufacturers to include Internet Explorer with the copies of Microsoft Windows they installed on systems they shipped. It would not allow the manufacturer to put an icon for any other web browser on the default desktop in place of Internet Explorer. Microsoft maintained that integration of its web browser into its operating system was in the interests of consumers.

Microsoft asserted in court that IE was integrated with Windows 98, and that Windows 98 could not be made to operate without it. Australian computer scientist Shane Brooks later demonstrated that Windows 98 could in fact run with IE files removed. Brooks went on to develop software designed to customize Windows by removing "undesired components", which is now known as LitePC. Microsoft has claimed that the software did not remove all components of Internet Explorer, leaving many dynamic link library files behind.

On April 3, 2000, Judge Jackson issued his findings of fact that Microsoft had abused its monopoly position by attempting to "dissuade Netscape from developing Navigator as a platform", that it "withheld crucial technical information", and attempted to reduce Navigator's usage share by "giving Internet Explorer away and rewarding firms that helped build its usage share" and "excluding Navigator from important distribution channels".

Jackson also released a remedy that suggested Microsoft should be broken up into two companies. This remedy was overturned on appeal, amidst charges that Jackson had revealed a bias against Microsoft in communication with reporters. The findings of fact that Microsoft had broken the law, however, were upheld. Seven months later, the Department of Justice agreed on a settlement agreement with Microsoft. As of 2004, although nineteen states have agreed to the settlement, Massachusetts is still holding out.

Hiatus and security troubles (2003–2006)

In a May 7, 2003 Microsoft online chat, Brian Countryman, Internet Explorer Program Manager, declared that on Microsoft Windows, Internet Explorer would cease to be distributed separately from the operating system (IE 6 being the last standalone version); it would, however, be continued as a part of the evolution of the operating system, with updates coming bundled in operating system upgrades. Thus, Internet Explorer and Windows itself would be kept more in sync.

New feature work did continue in 2003 during the development of Windows Vista; a preview release was released at the Professional Developers Conference in October 2003 which contained an updated Internet Explorer with a version number of 6.05.  New features noted by reviewers included a Download Manager, pop-up blocker, add-on manager and a tool to clear browsing history. With the exception of the download manager, which was eventually discarded, these features all appeared in builds of Internet Explorer included with preview builds of Windows XP Service Pack 2 a few months later.

Windows XP Service Pack 2, which was released in August 2004 after a number of delays, also contained a number of security-related fixes, new restrictions on code execution, and user interface elements that aimed to better protect the user from malware.  One notable user interface element that was introduced was the "information bar".  Tony Schriner, a developer on the Internet Explorer team, explained that the information bar was introduced to reduce the possibility that the user might mis-click and allow the installation of software they did not intend, as well as to simply reduce the number of pop-ups displayed to the user.  Most reviews of this release focused on the addition of the pop-up blocker, as it had been seen as a major omission at a time when pop-up ads had become a major source of irritation for web users.

On December 19, 2005, Microsoft announced that it would no longer support Internet Explorer for the Macintosh, and recommended using other Macintosh browsers such as Safari.

New competition (2006–2014)

From 2006 to 2009 Internet Explorer market share slowly declined, and the policy change (announced in 2003) of only releasing new versions with new versions of the Windows operating system was reversed with plans for IE7. In 2006, five years after the release of IE 6, beta versions of Version 7.0 were released, and version 7 was released that October (the same month as Firefox 2.0). Internet Explorer was renamed Windows Internet Explorer, as part of Microsoft's rebranding of component names that are included with Windows. It was available as part of Windows Vista, and as a separate download via Microsoft Update for Windows XP with Service Pack 2 and Windows Server 2003 Service Pack 1.  Internet Explorer 7 was also available for download directly from Microsoft's website. Large amounts of the underlying architecture, including the rendering engine and security framework, had been completely overhauled. Partly as a result of security enhancements, the browser became a stand-alone application, rather than integrated with the Windows shell, and was no longer capable of acting as a file browser. The first security advisory was posted only one day after the day of release, but it turned out to be a security problem in Outlook Express, not in Internet Explorer 7. The first vulnerability exclusive to Internet Explorer 7 was posted after 6 days. In March 2009 Version 8.0 was released, with the first public beta having been released on March 5, 2008. IE8 offered better support for web standards than previous versions, with plans for improved support for RSS, CSS, and Ajax, as well as full compliance for Cascading Style Sheets 2.1. It was also the first version to successfully pass the Acid2 test. In addition, Internet Explorer 8 included new features such as WebSlices, colour-coded tab groups and an improved phishing filter.

With Google's popular Chrome browser steadily gaining popularity due to its speed, simplicity, and support of newer technologies like HTML5, Microsoft released Internet Explorer 9 in September 2010, marketing it as showcasing the "Beauty of the Web;" Internet Explorer 9 offered features intended to enhance web browsing, such as partial HTML5 support, hardware acceleration, and better Windows integration. Adobe released a beta version of Flash 10.2 tailored to take advantage of Internet Explorer 9's built-in hardware acceleration capabilities on November 30, 2010.  Microsoft tried to make Internet Explorer simpler to use (and thus more desirable) than its competitors, and added features such as the ability to drag URLs and bookmarks to the Windows Taskbar, a unified downloads manager, a redesigned new tab page featuring your most recently visited sites, and the ability to "tear" tabs away from a window, or drag them away vertically to create their own window. All of these functions already existed on alternate browsers though, such as Opera, Google Chrome and Firefox, and a lot of these functions look similar to what other browsers already had.

When it released in December 2010, Internet Explorer 9 required Windows Vista SP2 or later, in a time when  44% of computers still ran Windows XP.  The marketing strategy or lack of cross-platform support was met with criticism, and backfired with Microsoft Edge's slow adoption on Windows 10. Google Chrome imposed no such restrictions, supporting Windows XP until 2014.

Windows 10 and Microsoft Edge (2014–present) 

On September 30, 2014, Microsoft, during a media event, announced the next version of Windows, under the name Windows 10. At that time, it was announced that Windows 10 would be the last completely new version of Windows, but Windows would still live on as more of a service with continuous improvements over its foreseeable future. During the event, a successor to Internet Explorer was announced, under the codename "Project Spartan". This meant the inevitable death of Internet Explorer after nearly 20 years, though this fact was not initially stated during the launch of Windows 10.

Later, the new interface and render engine for Project Spartan were leaked to Insiders in a developer preview of Windows 10, which could be enabled in Internet Explorer on Windows 10. On the same date as the launch of the new interface, a page on Microsoft's website announced the new name for Project Spartan—Microsoft Edge.

Windows 10 was released on July 29, 2015 as a free upgrade to existing Windows 8.1 and Windows 7 customers. While Microsoft Edge was featured front-and-center, Internet Explorer 11 remains available to use in the new OS for compatibility purposes, although it is hidden in the Windows Accessories folder. A notable trace of Internet Explorer, though, exists in that the platform version number of the EdgeHTML rendering engine in the first release, version 12, clearly continues the numbering scheme of the predecessor Trident engine used in IE.

Market adoption and usage share

The adoption rate of Internet Explorer seems to be closely related to that of Microsoft Windows, as it is the default web browser that comes with Windows. Since the integration of Internet Explorer 2.0 with Windows 95 OSR 1 in 1996, and especially after version 4.0's release, the adoption was greatly accelerated: from below 20% in 1996 to about 40% in 1998 and over 80% in 2000.

A CNN article noted at the release of Internet Explorer 4: "Microsoft's Internet Explorer has made inroads and various estimates put its share of the browser market 30 to 35 percent from about 10 percent a year ago." By 2002, Internet Explorer had almost completely superseded its main rival Netscape and dominated the market with up to 95 percent market share.
After having fought and won the browser wars of the late 1990s, Internet Explorer gained almost total dominance of the browser market. Having attained a peak of about 95% during 2002 and 2003, its market share has since declined at a slow but steady pace. Usage is higher in Asia and lower in Europe.

Firefox 1.0 had surpassed Internet Explorer 5 in early 2005 with Firefox 1.0 at roughly 8 percent market share.
An article notes at the release of Internet Explorer 7 in October 2006 that "IE6 had the lion's share of the browser market with 77.22%. Internet Explorer 7 had climbed to 3.18%, while Firefox 2.0 was at 0.69%."

Internet Explorer 7 was released at the same time as Firefox 2.0, and overtook Firefox 1.x by November 2006, at roughly 9% market share. Firefox 2.0 had overtaken 1.x by January 2007, but IE7 did not surpass IE6 until December 2007. By January 2008, their respective version market share stood at 43% IE7, 32% IE6, 16% FF2, 4% Safari 3 and both FF1.x and IE5 versions at less than half a percent.

Approximate usage over time based on various usage share counters averaged for the year overall, or for the fourth quarter, or for the last month in the year depending on availability of reference.

According to StatCounter Internet Explorer's marketshare fell below 50% in September 2010. In May 2012 it was announced that Google Chrome overtook Internet Explorer as the most used browser worldwide.

Desktop market share by year and version
Approximate usage over time based on various usage share counters averaged for the year overall, or for the fourth quarter, or for the last month in the year depending on availability of reference.

Industry adoption
Browser Helper Objects are also used by many search engine companies and third parties for creating add-ons that access their services, such as search engine toolbars. Because of the use of COM, it is possible to embed web-browsing functionality in third-party applications. Hence, there are a number of Internet Explorer shells, and a number of content-centric applications like RealPlayer also use Internet Explorer's web browsing module for viewing web pages within the applications.

See also
 Internet Explorer
 Internet Explorer version history
 Features of Internet Explorer

References

Further reading 
 
 
 
 
 
 
 
 

Internet Explorer
Internet Explorer
Internet Explorer